Roztoka may refer to:

 Roztoka, Subcarpathian Voivodeship (south-east Poland)
 Roztoka, Lower Silesian Voivodeship (south-west Poland)
 Roztoka, Lublin Voivodeship (east Poland)
 Roztoka, Limanowa County in Lesser Poland Voivodeship (south Poland)
 Roztoka, Nowy Sącz County in Lesser Poland Voivodeship (south Poland)
 Roztoka, Tarnów County in Lesser Poland Voivodeship (south Poland)
 Roztoka, Masovian Voivodeship (east-central Poland)
 Roztoka, Greater Poland Voivodeship (west-central Poland)
 Roztoka, Pomeranian Voivodeship (north Poland)

See also